Leach's storm petrel or Leach's petrel (Hydrobates leucorhous) is a small seabird of the tubenose order. It is named after the British zoologist William Elford Leach. The scientific name is derived from Ancient Greek. Hydrobates is from hydōr "water", and batēs "walker", and leucorhous is from leukos, "white" and orrhos, "rump". It was formerly defined in the genus Oceanodroma before that genus was synonymized with Hydrobates.

It breeds on inaccessible islands in the colder northern areas of the Atlantic and Pacific Oceans. It nests in colonies close to the sea in well concealed areas such as rock crevices, shallow burrows, or even logs. It lays a single white egg, which often has a faint ring of purple spots at the large end. This storm petrel is strictly nocturnal at the breeding sites to avoid predation by gulls and skuas, and  even avoids coming to land on clear, moonlit nights. The largest colony of Leach's storm petrels can be found on Baccalieu Island of eastern Canada, an ecological reserve with ~1.95 million pairs of the birds at last estimate in 2013.

Description
Leach's petrel, known in some rural areas (particularly in Newfoundland) as Mother Carey's chicks, Carey chicks, or Careys,  is a small bird at 18–21 cm in length with a 43– to 48-cm wingspan.  Like many other storm petrels, it has all-dark plumage and usually a white rump. However, dark-rumped individuals exist on the west coast of North America; they are very rare north of southern California, but the percentage increases suddenly on the United States-Mexico border, where 90-100% of breeding birds are dark-rumped. In Europe, it can be readily distinguished from the European storm petrel and  Wilson's storm petrel by its larger size, forked tail, different rump pattern, and flight behavior. Identification in the Americas, however, proves more difficult. On the Atlantic Coast, separating this species from band-rumped storm petrels is difficult; identification involves characteristics such as the extent of white on the rump and flight pattern. Discerning this species from others is arguably hardest on the Pacific Coast, where the dark-rumped form can be confused with at least three other all-dark storm petrel species. Here, identification involves close attention to wingbeats and overall color. It has a fluttering flight, and patters on the water as it picks planktonic food items from the ocean surface. Like most petrels, its walking ability is limited to a short shuffle to the burrow.

Subspecies
 H. l. leucorhous — (Vieillot, 1818) — coasts of the North Pacific and the North Atlantic
 H. l. chapmani — von Berlepsch, 1906 — Coronados and San Benito Island (Mexico)

Distribution and habitat
It is strictly pelagic outside the breeding season, and this, together with its remote breeding sites, makes Leach's petrel a difficult bird to see from land. Only in storms might this species be pushed into headlands.  Unlike the European storm petrel, it does not follow ships. In Europe, the best chance of seeing this species is in September in Liverpool Bay between north Wales and England. Strong north-westerlies funnel migrating Leach's petrels into this bay. British ornithologists Robert Atkinson and John Ainslie observed the communities of Leach's petrel on the remote Scottish islands of North Rona between 16 July and 12 August 1936, and on Sula Sgeir between 3 and 4 August 1939. The bird was first photographed at the nest in 1958, on Eilean Mor, one of the Flannan Isles off the west coast of the Outer Hebrides in Scotland, by Jo Moran.

Ecology
Lifespan for this bird is unusually long for a bird of such small size, with an average of 25 years and a maximum recorded lifespan of 38+ years (a bird banded between 1979 and 1982 recaptured in 2019 still healthy). In 2003, Haussmann et al.  found that the bird's telomeres lengthen with age, the only known example to date of such a phenomenon. However, this phenomenon likely also occurs in other members of the Procellariiformes, which all have a rather long lifespan compared to their size.

They feed primarily on plankton, including euphausiids, copepods, and a form of amphipod that is parasitic to jellyfish gonadal pouches.  They also feed to a large extent on myctophids (lantern fish), which only occur at the surface at night in water over the continental slope.  Individuals have been observed to feed at distances up to 1000 km from their breeding colony.  A breeding individual stores energy-rich lipids in a sac anterior to its stomach, which is used to either sustain itself while incubating its single egg, to feed its chick, or as a defensive mechanism when caught by a predator, as do many other Procellariformes. Some evidence shows that parents feed their chicks different prey species from what they consume themselves.  Parent birds also accidentally feed their chicks plastic debris, which they mistake for food items floating on the surface of the ocean. Chicks grow to a prefledging weight almost double  that of when they actually fledge from the burrow in late September.  During their migration, they travel to waters associated with the North Equatorial Current, or to waters associated with the Benguela Current. Fall storms can cause these young fledging individuals to wreck on the mainland.

References

External links

Leach’s Storm Petrel - The Atlas of Southern African Birds
Leach's storm-petrel [Oceanodroma leucorhoa] - photos, Christopher Taylor Nature Photography
Leach's storm-petrel Oceanodroma leucorhoa - USGS Patuxent Bird Identification InfoCenter
Stamps (for Canada, Faroe Islands and Marshall Islands)
Leach's Storm-Petrel Oceanodroma leucorhoa - photos, VIREO
Leach's Storm-Petrel (Oceanodroma leucorhoa) - Avibase

Leach's storm petrel
Birds of the Atlantic Ocean
Birds of the Pacific Ocean
Birds of Iceland
Birds of Europe
Birds of Saint Pierre and Miquelon
Native birds of Eastern Canada
Native birds of Western Canada
Subterranean nesting birds
Leach's storm petrel
Leach's storm petrel
Holarctic birds